Jennifer Kathleen Aitchison is an Australian politician in the New South Wales Legislative Assembly as member for Maitland for the Labor Party at the 2015 New South Wales state election. She is currently the Shadow Minister for Transport in the NSW Shadow Cabinet.

Before her election Aitchison worked as a managing director of tourism and hospitality companies.

Early years and background 
Aitchison was born in Canberra, Australian Capital Territory born to Jim and Anne O'Connor a library officer in the Commonwealth Public Service and also one of the first women to receive paid maternity leave for the birth of Jenny. Aitchison at around about eight years old started to follow in her mother's footsteps and commenced working at her local library as a volunteer.

In 1985 during the first International Year of Youth, Aitchison was selected to represent her school on an interschool newspaper which is where she later said was "the start of my activism".

At 21 years of age, Aitchison joined the Australian Labor Party and later that year joined the Commonwealth public service in the Department of Immigration and Ethnic Affairs, an experience where she has later said was "sad yet ultimately hopeful [hearing the] stories of the many thousands of people who had unsuccessfully applied to come to Australia as refugees or migrants. I read with a sense of deep shame and embarrassment a question from an overseas school student to the Minister asking if it was really true that Australia had once had a policy that we would only let people with white skin into Australia". Aitchison then moved into the Social Justice Coordination Section, responsibilities here included drafting the department's Agenda for Women and consultations around Australia, in addition to hearing firsthand the stories of many refugee and migrant women.

In 1996 when John Howard and the Coalition came to Government, Aitchison joined the staff of the Opposition as chief of staff for the member for Fraser, Steve Dargavel.

A year later in 1997 Aitchison met her husband, Robert, and moved to Walcha (a small town in the New England Tableland).  Her family received an Australia Day award for their contribution to tourism in Walcha in 1999. A year later, Aitchison moved to Maitland with six-week-old son Joshua.

Aitchison was also Managing Director of tourism company Northern Highland Travel Pty Ltd where she operated package coach tours across the region. At its peak the company employed 35 employees and undertook tours all over Australia, specialising in providing unique tours showcasing regional and remote destinations and events.

Working in the tourism and hospitality industries, Aitchison has won approximately 20 local, regional, state and national tourism and business awards including the NSW Tourism Awards three years in a row. In 2003 her company was inducted into the Tourism NSW Hall of Fame. In 2006 Aitchison won the BusNSW and the Bus Industry Confederation's National Young Achiever Award and her business was a finalist in the Telstra Business Awards. In 2005 Aitchison was awarded the Lower Hunter Business Woman of the Year.

Aitchison was active in a number of business and industry organisations, including BusNSW, the national Bus Industry Confederation and Hunter Tourism, the Maitland Business Chamber and the Lower Hunter Business Enterprise Centre.

In 2005, Vicki Woods and Bronwyn Ridgway founded the non-party political Women's Network Hunter NSW with the aim of increasing the number of women participating in decision making roles in the community. At the time there were no females representing Maitland at the State or Federal level and only two female councillors on Maitland City Council. Woods and Ridgway asked Aitchison to be the Foundation President of the organisation, which she went on to lead for seven years. On the resignation of Woods as Secretary Aitchison then took on the role for an additional two years.

Political career 
Aitchison was elected as member for Maitland at the 2015 New South Wales election with a vote of 63%, beating incumbent Robyn Parker on a swing of +18.8 points. Following the election, she was elected as the NSW Chair of Commonwealth Women Parliamentarians (CWP).

In 2016 she was elected as deputy chair of the CWP National Steering Committee and in March of that year was promoted to the shadow cabinet and appointed as the Shadow Minister for the Prevention of Domestic Violence and Sexual Assault, and Shadow Minister for Small Business. From March 2018, Aitchison was the Acting Shadow Minister for Women.

At the 2019 New South Wales election, Aitchison was re-elected with a first preference vote increase of +1.79 points, but the overall two-party vote suffered a small swing of −0.62 points against her this was likely due to 8 candidates contesting the seat. During the 2019 ALP NSW Leadership contest, Aitchison supported new leader Jodi Mackay and following the shadow ministry reshuffle was promoted to Shadow Minister for Investment and Tourism, Medical Research, and Primary Industries. Following the appointment of Chris Minns as the Leader of the Opposition in June 2021, Aitchison was designated as the Shadow Minister for Regional Transport and Roads.

References

Living people
Australian Labor Party members of the Parliament of New South Wales
Members of the New South Wales Legislative Assembly
Australian National University alumni
University of Canberra alumni
University of Sydney alumni
Australian women in business
People from Canberra
Year of birth missing (living people)
Women members of the New South Wales Legislative Assembly
21st-century Australian politicians
21st-century Australian women politicians